Rajesh Jejurikar is the Executive Director (Auto & Farm Sectors) of Mahindra & Mahindra Ltd., an Indian multinational automobile manufacturing corporation headquartered in Mumbai. He is a Director on the Board of Mahindra & Mahindra Ltd and serves on the boards of several Mahindra Group companies in India as well as overseas.

Career
After having worked with Voltas (1986–90), FCB Ulka (1990–91) and Marico Ltd. (1991-2000), Jejurikar joined the Automotive Sector at Mahindra & Mahindra Ltd., as Vice President (Marketing) and was part of the team that launched the Scorpio. His role was expanded in 2003, when he was appointed Executive Vice President (Sales & Marketing) for the Automotive Sector.

In 2005, Jejurikar was given additional responsibility as the Managing Director of Mahindra Renault, where he oversaw the development and launch of the Logan in India. In 2008, he became Chief of Operations of the Automotive Sector and when Automotive & Farm Equipment Sector (AFS) was formed in 2010, he was appointed Chief Executive for the Automotive Division. and Member of the Group Executive Board. Under his aegis, the Mahindra XUV500 was launched.

After ten months as president of Zee Entertainment Enterprises Ltd he re-joined Mahindra & Mahindra Ltd. as Chief Executive (Tractor & Farm Mechanization) in 2013. In April 2014, he was given additional responsibility of the Mahindra Two Wheeler Business.

He also served on the Board of Trringo.com Ltd.

References

Living people
Indian business executives
Year of birth missing (living people)
Wharton School of the University of Pennsylvania alumni